Aldo Tarlao (26 March 1926 – 12 March 2018) was an Italian rower who competed in the 1948 Summer Olympics and in the 1952 Summer Olympics. He was born in Grado. In 1948 he was a crew member of the Italian boat which won the silver medal in the coxed pair event. Four years later he finished fourth with the Italian boat in the coxed pair competition.

References

External links 
 
 
 
 

1926 births
2018 deaths
People from Grado, Friuli-Venezia Giulia
Italian male rowers
Olympic rowers of Italy
Rowers at the 1948 Summer Olympics
Rowers at the 1952 Summer Olympics
Olympic silver medalists for Italy
Olympic medalists in rowing
Medalists at the 1948 Summer Olympics
European Rowing Championships medalists
Sportspeople from Friuli-Venezia Giulia